The Forester of the Silver Wood (German: Der Förster vom Silberwald) is a 1954 Austrian-West German drama film directed by Alfons Stummer and starring Anita Gutwell, Rudolf Lenz and Karl Ehmann. It is part of the post-war trend of heimatfilm set in rural Austria or southern Germany. It was a popular success, leading to several follow-up films with the same lead actors including The Poacher of the Silver Wood. In Austria it was released as Echo of the Mountains (German: Echo der Berge).

It was shot at the Sievering Studios in Vienna with location shooting in Salzburg and the Tyrol. The film's sets were designed by the art director Eduard Stolba.

Cast
 Anita Gutwell as Liesl  
 Rudolf Lenz as Hubert  
 Karl Ehmann as Hofrat Leonhard  
 Erik Frey as Max  
 Hermann Erhardt as Oberkogler  
 Erni Mangold as Karin  
 Albert Rueprecht 
 Lotte Ledl as Vroni  
 Franz Erkenger 
 Gerti Wiedner 
 Walter Varndal 
 Fritz Hinz-Fabricius

References

Bibliography 
 Baer, Hester. Dismantling the Dream Factory: Gender, German Cinema, and the Postwar Quest for a New Film Language. Berghahn Books, 2012.

External links 
 

1954 films
1954 drama films
Austrian drama films
German drama films
West German films
1950s German-language films
Films set in the Alps
Films about hunters
Films set in forests
1950s German films
Films shot at Sievering Studios